Morten Hegreberg (born 11 June 1977) is a Norwegian former professional cyclist. He competed in the men's individual road race at the 2004 Summer Olympics. He is the older brother of Roy Hegreberg.

Major results

1995
 1st  Road race, National Junior Road Championships
2000
 1st Stage 2 Ringerike GP
2002
 7th Classic Loire Atlantique
2003
 2nd Road race, National Road Championships
2004
 3rd Road race, National Road Championships
2005
 1st Stage 7 An Post Rás
 3rd Road race, National Road Championships
2006
 1st  Team time trial, National Road Championships
 1st Stage 9 An Post Rás
2007
 5th Flèche du Sud
2008
 7th Rogaland Grand Prix

References

External links

1977 births
Living people
Norwegian male cyclists
Olympic cyclists of Norway
Cyclists at the 2004 Summer Olympics
Sportspeople from Stavanger